('Angel') is a 2018 Belgian drama film written and directed by Koen Mortier, and stars Vincent Rottiers and Fatou N'Diaye. It was screened in the Contemporary World Cinema section at the 2018 Toronto International Film Festival. The movie was based on the fictional novel, Monologue of Someone Who Got Used to Talking to Herself, by Flemish writer Dimitri Verhulst. In January 2019, it was nominated for the Magritte Award for Best Flemish Film.

Plot
The film follows the encounter between Fae, a prostitute, and Thierry, a Belgian disgraced star bicycle racer. During his holiday in Senegal, where Thierry has taken some time off after a racing mishap, he meets Fae and it is love at first sight. They find dignity and hope in each other as they strive to overcome their troubles. But more important than these mutual desires, they find love.

Cast
 Vincent Rottiers as Thierry
 Paul Bartel as Serge
 Fatou N'Diaye as Fae
 Aïcha Cissé as Binta

References

External links
 
 

2018 films
2018 drama films
Belgian drama films
2010s French-language films
French-language Belgian films